Reintarnation is the first compilation album by k.d. lang, released in 2006. The album's cover is a homage to Elvis Presley's debut album cover, Elvis Presley.

Track listing

References

K.d. lang albums
2006 compilation albums
Rhino Records compilation albums